Tammi may refer to

 Tammi (company), a Finnish publishing company
 Jukka Tammi (born 1962), Finnish ice hockey goaltender
 Tammi Øst (born 1958), Danish actress
 Tammi Patterson (born 1990), Australian tennis player
 Tammi Reiss (born 1970), American actress and former Women's National Basketball Association player
 Tammi Terrell (1945–1970), American singer

See also
 Tammy (disambiguation)
 Tami (disambiguation)
 Tamme (disambiguation)